Artemisium or Artemision (Greek: Ἀρτεμίσιον) is a cape in northern  Euboea, Greece.  The legendary hollow cast bronze statue of Zeus, or possibly Poseidon, known as the Artemision Bronze, was found off this cape in a sunken ship, as was the Jockey of Artemision, a bronze statue of a racehorse and its jockey.

The Battle of Artemisium, a series of naval engagements over three days during the second Persian invasion of Greece in 480 BC, simultaneously with the more famous land battle at Battle of Thermopylae, took place here. Part of the action of the film 300: Rise of an Empire was loosely based on this historic battle.

See also
 Temple of Artemis
 Artemisio

References

Euboea
Headlands of Greece
Landforms of Euboea (regional unit)